Sathyamangala is a census town in Hassan district in the Indian state of Karnataka.

Demographics
 India census, Sathyamangala had a population of 11,399. Males constitute 51% of the population and females 49%. Sathyamangala has an average literacy rate of 81%, higher than the national average of 59.5%: male literacy is 85%, and female literacy is 76%. In Sathyamangala, 10% of the population is under 6 years of age.

References

Cities and towns in Hassan district